Thought 'Ya Knew is the second solo studio album by American singer-songwriter CeCe Peniston, released on January 10, 1994 by A&M Records, and on February 10, 1994 in Japan. For this album, Peniston once again collaborated with Chicago-based producer Steve "Silk" Hurley, along with other producers Carsten Schack and Kenneth Karlin (better recognized as duo Soulshock & Karlin) from Denmark, David Morales, Sir Jinx, and on one track ("Forever in My Heart") also with the multiple Grammy Award-nominee Brian McKnight.

Deciding not to get pigeonholed into the dance genre, Peniston recorded several ballads for the album, trying to move into an R&B direction. Unlike its predecessor Finally, Peniston's second album was, therefore, a calculated mixture of pop ballads and R&B beats, though incorporating also other genres, such as jazz ("I'm in the Mood"), funk (I'm Not Over You"), reggae ("Through Those Doors") and gospel ("I Will Be Received").

The album received generally mixed reviews from music critics, and commercially, it proved to be a moderate success. Debuting on February 12, 1994 at number 102 on the Billboard 200, the album reached its peak a week later at number ninety-six, while spending nineteen weeks on the US chart in total. Overseas, the album entered the UK Albums Chart at number thirty-one, but charted for only two weeks there. Other territories included Switzerland (at number thirty-two), Japan (at number sixty-six), Netherlands (at number sixty-nine), and Germany (at number ninety-two).

Four official singles were released from the album, three of which entered the Billboard Hot 100, as well as the UK Singles Chart. All of them became successful on the dance chart, bringing Peniston two additional number one hits on the US Hot Dance Club Songs. In Japan, the album was shortly followed by Remix Collection, which featured alternate versions of songs issued on singles. It was reissued in Japan on September 11, 1996. The album was not accompanied by a worldwide tour.

Critical reception

Thought 'Ya Knew received mainly mixed reviews. In terms of artistic achievement, dancefloor potential or chart performance, the album did not match the success of Peniston's debut album, Finally. Jose F. Promis from AllMusic, however, blamed the record label A&M for marketing the artist to an R&B audience, which he called the "big mistake". Giving the album three (ouf of five stars), he highlighted especially "Hit by Love" as the song closer in spirit to Peniston's early dance hits, but he admitted that by that time of the single's release its "steam had worn off". Both critics, Martin Johnson from Chicago Reader and Johnny Huston from Entertainment Weekly agreed that the album's low points occurred on its ballads and that Peniston faltered on slower numbers. (Johnson also added that even Toni Braxton, who redefined the urban contemporary ballad, "would have trouble breathing life into them"). While Huston noticed Patti LaBelle-influenced vocal stylings (on "Through Those Doors"), Johnson recalled young Chaka Khan and stressed the pungent lower registers of the singer's voice (on "Searchin'"). People magazine found the album's problem in Peniston's big-time pop success and her new need to be seen more serious than just a dance-music artist. Calling ballads "the ballads from hell", the magazine reproached that all the slow stuff did was focus on Peniston's vocal limitations.

Chart performance

On February 5, 1994 the album entered at number thirty-one (its peak) in the UK Albums Chart, spending two weeks on the chart. Followed by the Oricon list on February 10, Peniston received her first and her only album chart appearance to date in Japan, at number sixty-six (two charting weeks in total) After two weeks since its release, the album entered the US Billboard 200 at number one-hundred-two on February 12, 1994. Peaking its top the following week, at number ninety-six on February 19 (nineteen weeks in the chart). On the component, US Top R&B/Hip-Hop Albums chart, the album climbed to number twenty (being present for thirty-four weeks in the chart. Later on, the album would be classified as the seventy-first best R&B selling set of 1994.) In Dutch MegaCharts, the record started its five weeks long run on February 19, topping its third week at number sixty-nine. In addition, the album cracked the Swiss Music Charts on February 20, peaking on March 6 at number thirty-two (three weeks in the chart). And on February 28 also the German Media Control Charts, reaching at number ninety-two (with three weeks in the chart).

Track listing

Notes
  signifies an additional producer
  signifies a remix producer

Credits and personnel

 CeCe Peniston – lead vocal, backing vocals, vocal arrangement, executive production
 Damon Jones – executive production
 Manny Lehman – executive production
 Mark Dubuclet – production, mixing, drum programming, programming, keyboards, bass, multi instruments
 Steve "Silk" Hurley – production, arranging, editing, mixing
 David Morales – production, arranging, percussion, mixing
 Richard Wolf – production, guitar, drum programming, keyboards
 Steven Nikolas – vocal arrangement
 Brendon Sibley – vocal arrangement
 Soulshock & Karlin – production, mixing
 Sir Jinx – production
 Andres Levin – production
 Camus Maré Celli – production
 Andrea Martin – backing vocals, talking
 Norma Jean Wright – backing vocals
 Kymberli Armstrong – backing vocals
 Myron Glasper – backing vocals
 Jackie Gusheyk – backing vocals
 Sharon Pass – backing vocals
 Chantay Savage – backing vocals
 Katreese Barnes – backing vocals
 Sherree Ford-Payne – backing vocals
 Faith Wade – choir, chorus
 Niomisha Wilson – choir, chorus
 Brian McKnight – backing vocals, multi instruments, production
 Rodney Miller – guitar
 David Fiuczynski – guitar
 Michael McDonald – guitar
 Kamaal – bass
 Greg Mull – engineering, mixing
 Daryll Dobson – engineering, mixing
 Scott Ahaus – engineering, remixing
 Doug Michael – engineering
 David Sussman – engineering
 Steve Weeder – engineering
 Craig Porteils – engineering
 John Fundingsland – engineering
 Keith Barrios – engineering
 Anna Wheaton – engineering
 Chris Wood – engineering
 Brian Kinkel – engineering
 Brad Aldredge – engineering
 Victor McCoy – engineering assistance
 Brian Young – engineering assistance
 Daniel Beroff – engineering assistance
 Craig Burbidge – mixing
 Dave Way – mixing
 Doug DeAngelis – mixing
 Ken Kessie – mixing
 Kevin Crouse – mixing assistance
 Eric Flickinger – mixing assistance
 Eddie Sexton – mixing assistance
 Devin Foutz – mixing assistance
 Christian Delatour – mixing assistance
 Johnny Rogers – keyboards
 James Wirrick – keyboards
 Fernando Harkless – saxophone
 David Wills – drums
 Alec Shantzis – programming
 Satoshi Tomiie – programming
 Terry Burrus – programming
 Greg Lawson – drum programming
 Danny Madden – conducting
 Bill Ware – vibraphone
 C-N-A – multi instruments
 Colleen Donahue-Reynolds – production coordination
 Michael Lavine – photography

Charts

Weekly charts

Year-end charts

References

General

Specific

External links
 

1994 albums
CeCe Peniston albums
A&M Records albums